Kuusjoki is a former municipality of Finland. It was consolidated with Salo on January 1, 2009.

It is located in the province of Western Finland and is part of the Southwest Finland region. The municipality had a population of 1,781 (2004-12-31) and covered an area of 122.57 km² of which 0.11 km² is water. The population density was 14.54 inhabitants per km².

The municipality was unilingually Finnish.

External links

http://www.kuusjoki.fi/ – Official website 

Former municipalities of Finland
Salo, Finland
Populated places disestablished in 2009
2009 disestablishments in Finland